Al-Mazyunah is a Wilayat of Dhofar in the Sultanate of Oman., near the border with Yemen. There is an international border checkpoint at Al-Mazyunah.

References

Populated places in Oman
Oman–Yemen border crossings